Clueless is a 1995 American coming-of-age teen comedy film written and directed by Amy Heckerling. It stars Alicia Silverstone with supporting roles by Stacey Dash, Brittany Murphy and Paul Rudd (in his film debut). It was produced by Scott Rudin and Robert Lawrence. It is loosely based on Jane Austen's 1815 novel Emma, with a modern-day setting of Beverly Hills. The plot centers on a beautiful, popular, and rich high school student who befriends a new student and decides to give her a makeover while playing a matchmaker for her teachers and examining her own existence. While, she is playing matchmaker and dress-up, she is also looking for love in a nonchalant way, which brings her to falling for her ex step-brother, Josh. 

Clueless was filmed in California over a 40-day schedule. The film's director studied Beverly Hills high school students to understand how teenagers in the 1990s talked and learned some appropriate slang terms from them.

The film grossed $56.1 million in the United States. It has received positive reviews from critics and is considered to be one of the best teen films of all time. Clueless has developed a cult following and has a continuing legacy. The film was followed by a spin-off television sitcom and series of books.

Plot
Cher Horowitz is a stylish, good-natured, and popular teenager living in a Beverly Hills mansion with her wealthy father Mel, a gruff litigator; her mother died during a liposuction procedure when Cher was a baby. She attends Bronson Alcott High School with her best friend Dionne Davenport, who is also wealthy and beautiful. Dionne has a long-term relationship with popular student Murray Duvall, though Cher believes Dionne should be dating more mature men. Josh, the socially conscious son of Mel's ex-wife, visits Cher during a break from college. She playfully mocks his idealism, while he teases her for her vanity and superficial lifestyle.

After receiving a poor grade, Cher decides to orchestrate a romance between two teachers at her school, Ms. Geist and the hard-grading Mr. Hall, so that Hall will relax his standards and allow Cher to renegotiate the grade. After seeing their newfound happiness, Cher realizes that she enjoys doing good deeds.

When a "clueless" transfer student named Tai Frasier arrives at the school, Cher decides to make Tai her next project by giving her a makeover with the help of Dionne, providing Tai with confidence and a sense of style. Cher tries to extinguish the attraction between Tai and Travis Birkenstock, an amiable but clumsy slacker, and instead steer Tai towards handsome, popular student Elton. However, Elton has no interest in Tai and instead tries to make out with Cher in his car after a party. When she rebuffs him, he leaves her in a parking lot out of spite and she is mugged at gunpoint. Josh picks her up and the two begin to bond.

Fashion-conscious new student Christian attracts Cher's attention and becomes her target boyfriend. When she goes to a party with him, Josh becomes jealous and decides to follow her to the party. She invites Christian to her home and tries to seduce him, but he deflects her advances. Murray subsequently tells Cher and Dionne that Christian is gay. Despite the failure of her romantic overtures, Cher remains friends with him due to her admiration of his taste in art and fashion.

Cher's privileged life takes a negative turn when Tai's newfound popularity strains their relationship, and when she fails her driving test and cannot change the result. When Cher returns home in a depressed mood, Tai confesses that she has feelings for Josh and asks Cher for help in pursuing him. Cher says Tai is not right for Josh, leading to the two girls falling out. Feeling "totally clueless", Cher reflects on her priorities and her repeated failures to understand or appreciate the people in her life. After thinking about why she is bothered by Tai's romantic interest in Josh, Cher finally realizes that she is in love with him.

In response to her epiphany, Cher begins making awkward but sincere efforts to live a more purposeful life, including captaining the school's Pismo Beach disaster relief effort. She accepts an invitation by Travis to a skating tournament where she reconciles with Tai. Cher and Josh eventually follow through on their feelings for one another, culminating in a kiss. Ultimately, her friendships with Tai and Dionne are solidified. Sometime later, Mr. Hall and Miss Geist get married, and Cher attends the wedding with Josh, Dionne, Murray, and Tai and Travis (who have begun dating). Cher catches the wedding bouquet, and she and Josh embrace and kiss.

Cast

Production

Development
The idea for Clueless first originated as a television pilot in 1993. Writer and director Amy Heckerling said: "Twentieth Century Fox said they wanted a show about teenagers—but not the nerds. They wanted it to be about the cool kids. The most successful character in anything I'd ever done was Jeff Spicoli in Fast Times. People think that's because he was stoned and a surfer. But that's not it. It's because he's positive. So I thought, 'I'm going to write a character who's positive and happy.' And that was Cher." Heckerling, having read the Jane Austen novel Emma in college and loving the title character's positivity, decided to write the script around an Emma-like character, saying, "I started to think, 'What's the larger context for that kind of a 'nothing can go wrong' 'always looks through rose colored glasses' kind of girl? So I tried to take all the things that were in this sort of pretty 1800s world and see what would that be like if it was in Beverly Hills."

As research for the script, Heckerling sat in on classes at Beverly Hills High School to get a feel for the student culture, commenting, "...one thing I observed was these girls in a constant state of grooming." Ken Stovitz had become Heckerling's agent at the time and told her the script had the potential to be a feature film after he read it. The finished script, which was titled "No Worries", contained the main characters that would end up in the Clueless film. Twink Caplan, Heckerling's friend who had worked with her on past projects, said film executives at Fox were wary of the story being too female-oriented to appeal to a large enough audience. "It was obvious they didn't get it. They thought the script needed more boys in it. They were afraid that if they focused on girls, we wouldn't get any guys to see it. So it went into turnaround. It was dead", said Caplan.

Six months later, the script found its way to producer Scott Rudin, who gave it his stamp of approval. Rudin's support led to increased interest in the script, and it became the subject of a bidding war between studios which was eventually won by Paramount Pictures. Heckerling was excited, as Paramount owned several major youth-centered TV channels, such as MTV and Nickelodeon, which were suited to the film's target demographic.

Casting
Heckerling first saw Alicia Silverstone in the Aerosmith music video for "Cryin'" and kept her in the back of her mind for the role of Cher. When the film was still in development at Fox, executives suggested Alicia Witt, Keri Russell, Gwyneth Paltrow, and Angelina Jolie for the part. Heckerling met with Reese Witherspoon, who already had a few film roles to her credit. Though Silverstone only had the thriller The Crush as her previous film, the studio did not pressure Heckerling to cast big stars, and Silverstone ultimately won the role of Cher. Ben Affleck and Zach Braff auditioned for the role of Josh. Sarah Michelle Gellar was offered the role of Amber Mariens but turned it down due to her commitments to All My Children, while Zooey Deschanel auditioned for the role of Amber as well.

Seth Green auditioned for the role of Travis and Alanna Ubach was considered for the role of Tai. Terrence Howard and Dave Chappelle were considered for the role of Murray. Jeremy Renner and Jamie Walters auditioned for the role of Christian, and Jerry Orbach and Harvey Keitel were considered for the role of Cher's father, Melvin Horowitz.

The character of Wendell Hall, played by Wallace Shawn, was inspired by a real-life debate teacher at Beverly Hills High School and a friend of Heckerling's. Prior to full-time acting, Shawn had been a teacher and drew on his experience for his portrayal of Mr. Hall.

Filming

Principal photography for the film began on November 21, 1994, and consisted of a 40-day filming schedule. Brittany Murphy, who was 17 at the time, required a parent or guardian present during filming. The costume designer for Clueless was Mona May.

Scenes depicting the fictional Bronson Alcott High School campus including the tennis courts, outdoor cafeteria, and the quad were filmed at Occidental College in Los Angeles. Ulysses S. Grant High School in Valley Glen provided filming locations for the school's interior sets. Other notable filming locations include Circus Liquor in North Hollywood, where Cher is mugged in her designer dress, and Rodeo Drive, featured in Cher's "crisis" scene as she dejectedly wanders around after a failed driver's test and a confrontation with Tai.

The Mighty Mighty Bosstones performance, originally an outdoor event, had to be moved inside due to rain. Paul Rudd bought everyone gifts after filming wrapped.

Release

Box office
The film became a surprise sleeper hit of 1995. Clueless opened in 1,653 theaters on July 19, 1995, and grossed $10,612,443 on its opening weekend, which led to a ranking of second behind Apollo 13. The film grossed $56,631,572 during its theatrical run, becoming the 32nd-highest-grossing film of 1995. The box office success brought the then-largely unknown Silverstone to international attention and earned her a $10 million, multi-picture deal with Columbia TriStar. The film  developed a strong cult following after its release.

Critical reception
The film was well received by critics. On the review aggregation website Rotten Tomatoes, it holds an approval rating of 81% based on reviews from 120 critics, with an average rating of 6.8/10. The website's critics consensus reads, "A funny and clever reshaping of Emma, Clueless offers a soft satire that pokes as much fun at teen films as it does at the Beverly Hills glitterati." On Metacritic, the film has a 68 out of 100 rating based on 18 reviews, which indicates "generally favorable reviews".

Roger Ebert of the Chicago Sun-Times gave the film three-and-a-half out of four stars. Janet Maslin of The New York Times noted, "Even if Clueless runs out of gas before it's over, most of it is as eye-catching and cheery as its star." Peter Travers of Rolling Stone contrasted the film to a more adult-oriented movie about teenagers released around the same time, Kids, stating, "The materialism in Clueless is almost as scary as the hopelessness in Kids", but concluded Clueless is "wicked good fun to be had [and] Silverstone is a winner."

Accolades
In 2008, Entertainment Weekly selected Clueless as one of the "New Classics", a list of 100 best films released between 1983 and 2008; Clueless was ranked 42nd. That year, the publication also named it the 19th-best comedy of the past 25 years. The film is ranked as number 7 on Entertainment Weekly list of the 50 best high school films.

American Film Institute recognition:

 AFI's 100 Years... 100 Laughs – Nominated
 AFI's 100 Years...100 Movie Quotes – "As if!" Nominated

Comparison to Emma
Clueless is a loose adaptation of Jane Austen's 1815 novel Emma, and many of its characters have counterparts in the novel. 
 Cher Horowitz/Emma Woodhouse: Cher is representative of the main character Emma Woodhouse. Spunky, carefree, entitled, perpetually single, and matchmaker extraordinaire, both Cher and Emma enjoy the satisfaction of helping those who are without love find a perfect match. This is first seen within the first fifteen minutes of the film when both she and Dionne pair their English teacher with the school's Debate teacher. However, this is more prominently reflected when Cher does everything in her power to pair her newest friend Tai. While both Emma and Cher mean well in their matchmaking attempts, neither of them realizes the depths of her actions nor her feelings towards Josh/Mr. Knightley until Tai/Harriet asks her to set her up with Josh/Mr. Knightley.
 Josh/Mr. Knightley: Cher's former stepbrother, whom she finds utterly repulsive. At the beginning of the movie, she states that she has no positive feelings towards Josh in the slightest. The two bicker continually. However, as the movie progresses, Josh is shown to be more caring and considerate towards Cher, becoming defensive towards her choices of men and in life. In the novel, Mr. Knightley is the brother of Emma's sister's husband and is Emma's only critic. Cher/Emma and Josh/Mr. Knightley eventually realize they are in love.
 Tai/Harriet Smith: Tai, representative of the young, fair, and socially awkward Harriet Smith, is a newcomer to Bronson Alcott High School. Soon after, she is swept off her feet by both Cher and Dionne as they help her (unintentionally) become the most popular girl in school, to Cher's dismay. At the beginning of the film, Tai is attracted to Travis, a well-meaning, skateboard-riding, pot-smoking social recluse. Harriet is likewise attracted to humble farmer Robert Martin. Each is pressured by Cher/Emma to reject her lower-status potential lover, instead being pushed towards Elton/Mr Elton. Disastrously for Cher, Tai then falls for Josh. Emma is likewise horrified when Harriet falls in love with Mr. Knightley. In both cases, this leads to the heroine examining her own true feelings.
 Mel Horowitz/Mr. Henry Woodhouse: Similarly to Emma, Mr. Horowitz is a well known and respected man within his circle of friends, though there is one major difference between both characters: while Mr. Horowitz is shown to have little to no care for his health, Mr. Woodhouse is considered to be a valetudinarian. Both characters are shown to love their daughters greatly while not always being so forward in their affection.
 Christian/Frank Churchill: The initially appealing love interest of Cher, whom she convinces herself she must be in love with, similar to Frank Churchill in the book. In the book, Churchill is not available to Emma because he is secretly already engaged; in the film, Christian is not available to Cher because he is gay. Both characters engage in surface-level flirting with the heroine and make her consider her own feelings.
 Travis/Robert Martin: A stoner and skater who has a mutual attraction with Tai; however, their attempts at courtship are derailed for a time by Cher's attempt to set Tai up with Elton. Travis is an underachiever, is constantly late for class and often receives poor grades. In the book, Emma considers Martin, a farmer, to be beneath Harriet.
 Elton Tascia/Mr. Elton: Elton is a popular student whom Cher attempts to fix up with Tai. As is the case with the Elton from the book, he is not interested in Tai/Harriet and mistakenly believes that Cher/Emma is interested in him.
 Amber/Mrs. Elton: Cher's antagonist, who is implied to be dating Elton after Cher turns down his advance, similar to Mr. Elton taking a wife after Emma rejects him.
 Miss Geist/Miss Taylor and Mr. Hall/Mr. Weston: The initial targets of Cher's/Emma's matchmaking.

Home media
Clueless was released on VHS and LaserDisc on December 19, 1995, by Paramount Home Video. It was released on DVD on October 19, 1999. The special features solely included two theatrical trailers.

The film was reissued in a special 10th-anniversary "Whatever! Edition" DVD on August 30, 2005. The new issue included featurettes and cast interviews, including:The Class of '95 (a look at the cast), Creative Writing (Amy Heckerling talks about the script), Fashion 101 (how filmmakers invented the trendsetting style of Clueless), Language Arts (the director and cast members give facts on the groundbreaking slang and how Clueless revived Valspeak slang), Suck and Blow (how to play the game depicted in the Sun Valley party scene), Driver's Ed, We're History (stories from cast and crew of Clueless), and two theatrical trailers.

It was released on Blu-ray on May 1, 2012. Special features from the "Whatever! Edition" of 2005 were carried over to the Blu-ray and included a new trivia track.

Soundtrack

Certifications

Cultural impact and legacy

Cast

After the death of Brittany Murphy, Silverstone stated that she "always felt connected to [Murphy] as [they] shared a very special experience in [their] lives together", and said, "I loved working with Brittany. She was so talented, so warm, and so sweet."

Heckerling later described Silverstone as having "that Marilyn Monroe thing" as a "pretty, sweet blonde who, in spite of being the American ideal, people still really like."

The surviving cast reunited in October 2012 for an issue of Entertainment Weekly.

Heckerling later reunited with both Silverstone and Shawn for the 2012 vampire comedy film Vamps.

Popular culture and society
The film was well known for the characters' catchphrases and vocabulary. Cher's verbal style is also marked by ironic contrasts between current slang and historical references, such as when she compares Tai to "those Botticelli chicks".

The film also had a strong influence on fashion trends. Fashion as a form of self-expression played an important role in the narrative and character development of the film, television series, and novels, which are topics examined by academic Alice Leppert.

Donatella Versace's fall 2018 collection was influenced by Clueless.

Clueless was the main inspiration for Australian rapper Iggy Azalea's music video for her 2014 song "Fancy" featuring Charli XCX. Many visuals and costumes inspired by the film were used in the video, which is filled with remakes of Clueless scenes. The outfits are also reinvented to channel the famous stylings of the film with a slightly modern edge. "Fancy" was shot in the same Los Angeles high school where Clueless was filmed. A June 2018 episode of Lip Sync Battle featured Silverstone miming to "Fancy", wearing Cher's yellow plaid skirt suit.

A reference to Cher's seduction of Christian is included in the music video for Simone Battle's "He Likes Boys" (2011).

In the second episode of the second season of the BBC America thriller series Killing Eve, "Nice and Neat" (2019), the Russian assassin Villanelle calls her agency and uses the codename Cher Horowitz to secretly inform her boss she is in trouble and needs to be rescued after being kidnapped.

A 2020 Discover Card commercial featured a clip from the film consisting of Cher Horowitz saying her famous phrase "Uh uh, no way".

Spin-offs and adaptations

Television
In 1996, the producers created a spin-off television series, which followed parallel storylines of Cher and her friends. Several cast members from the film went on to star in the series, with the notable exceptions of Silverstone and Rudd, whose film careers had begun to take off. Silverstone was replaced in the series with actress Rachel Blanchard.

In October 2019, it was announced that CBS would be adapting the film into a drama series. The series is said to be centered around Dionne Davenport after Cher goes missing, and is described by Deadline Hollywood as a "baby pink and bisexual blue-tinted, tiny sunglasses-wearing, oat milk latte and Adderall-fueled look at what happens when the high school queen bee Cher disappears and her lifelong number two Dionne steps into Cher's vacant Air Jordans." On August 14, 2020, it was moved to NBCUniversal's streaming service Peacock. In May 2021, it was reported that the series would not be moving forward at Peacock and instead would be redeveloping at CBS Studios.

Books

Simon Spotlight Entertainment spun off a collection of paperback books from 1995 to 1999 aimed at adolescent readers.

In 2015, to celebrate the film's 20th anniversary, pop culture writer Jen Chaney published a book titled As If!: The Oral History of Clueless. The book is based on exclusive interviews with Heckerling, Silverstone, and other cast and crew members. Excerpts from the book were published in Vanity Fair.

Comics
A comic book series was launched in 2017.

Stage musical
Clueless: The Musical opened in New York City on December 11, 2018, as part of The New Group's 2018–2019 season. The show was written by Heckerling and starred Dove Cameron as Cher and Dave Thomas Brown as Josh. It closed on January 12, 2019.

The musical was a jukebox musical featuring pop songs from the 1990s, though with lyrics mostly or entirely rewritten by Heckerling to fit the storyline. Songs adapted from the film's soundtrack included "Supermodel" and "Kids in America".

Video games
Clueless CD-ROM was released in 1997. Paramount announced in 2008 that they would be releasing video games based on their films Clueless, Mean Girls, and Pretty in Pink. The games were planned to be released on both the PC and the Nintendo DS, but only the PC games were released. Clueless on PC was released in 2009. The DS game was found by YouTuber Ray Mona (also known as Raven Simone) and a full play-through of the game was released on her channel on April 1, 2021. In 2017, Episode launched an animated web story based on the film.

See also
 Cinema of the United States

References

External links

 
 
 
 
 
 
 

1995 films
1995 LGBT-related films
1995 romantic comedy films
1990s American films
1990s buddy comedy films
1990s coming-of-age comedy films
1990s English-language films
1990s female buddy films
1990s high school films
1990s teen comedy films
1990s teen romance films
American buddy comedy films
American coming-of-age comedy films
American female buddy films
American high school films
American romantic comedy films
American teen comedy films
American teen LGBT-related films
American teen romance films
Coming-of-age romance films
Films about father–daughter relationships
Films about teenagers
Films about the upper class
Films about virginity
Films adapted into comics
Films adapted into plays
Films adapted into television shows
Films based on Emma (novel)
Films directed by Amy Heckerling
Films produced by Scott Rudin
Films scored by David Kitay
Films set in Beverly Hills, California
Films shot in Beverly Hills, California
Films shot in Los Angeles
Films with screenplays by Amy Heckerling
Gay-related films
LGBT-related comedy films
Marvin the Martian films
Paramount Pictures films